Brege is a small village south of Krško in eastern Slovenia. The area is part of the traditional region of Lower Carniola. It is now included with the rest of the municipality in the Lower Sava Statistical Region.

Name
Brege was attested in written sources as Rayn in 1358 and Rain  1442.

References

External links
Brege on Geopedia

Populated places in the Municipality of Krško